Unwritten rules (synonyms: Unspoken rules) are behavioral constraints imposed in organizations or societies that are not typically voiced or written down. They usually exist in unspoken and unwritten format because they form a part of the logical argument or course of action implied by tacit assumptions. Examples involving unspoken rules include unwritten and unofficial organizational hierarchies, organizational culture, and acceptable behavioral norms governing interactions between organizational members.

For example, the captain of a ship is always expected to be the last to evacuate it in a disaster. Or, as Vince Waldron wrote, "A pet, once named, instantly becomes an inseparable member of the family."

Employment and discrimination
In the workplace, some unspoken rules can have a significant impact on one’s job satisfaction, advancement opportunities, and career trajectory.

In sports, Scottish football club, Rangers until 1989 had an unwritten rule of not signing any player who was openly Catholic. Yorkshire County Cricket Club also historically had an unwritten rule that cricketers could only play for them if they were born within the historical county boundaries of Yorkshire.

See also 
Ius non scriptum
Lex non scripta
Unenumerated rights
Unwritten rules of baseball

References

Logic
Rules
Rights
2001 neologisms

sv:Social norm#Oskriven regel